Nicolás Zúñiga y Miranda (13 May 1865 – 8 July 1925) was a Mexican eccentric who was famous for being a perennial candidate in his country's presidential elections. Although he never won a significant share of the votes, he considered himself to be the victor every time.

Early life

Zúñiga y Miranda was born in Zacatecas into a family of old Spanish nobility. He went to Mexico City to study law and became a lawyer, but first gained fame in 1887 when he claimed to have invented a machine that could predict earthquakes. He successfully predicted an earthquake that struck the capital that year. After this success, he predicted that on August 10 of the same year Mexico City would be completely destroyed by simultaneous eruptions of the Cerro del Peñón and the Popocatépetl, which caused several inhabitants to leave the capital at that date. The prediction proved to be false. He founded several ephemeral magazines in which he attempted to predict natural disasters or other events, including the end of time, without much success.

Early political career

He had almost disappeared from public attention when he announced his candidacy as the 'candidate of the people' for the 1892 presidential elections. Zúñiga's opponent was dictator Porfirio Díaz, who had ruled the country since 1876 and turned elections into a mere formality. Zúñiga claimed to have been victorious in the elections and protested against the alleged election fraud. Díaz had him arrested and he was sentenced to 25 days of solitary confinement. After being released Zúñiga made himself a presidential sash, declared himself to be the 'legitimate president' and called Díaz a usurper. In 1896, 1900, 1904, and 1910 he again participated in the presidential elections, every time with the same result: he received only a small number of votes, claimed fraud, and declared himself to be president. It was said that Zúñiga honestly believed he was elected by the people, and turned into a popular figure in Mexico City. He was often invited for parties, in restaurants or for other public events, in which the population treated him as if he really were the president. The Díaz government considered him to be a madman who was amusing rather than dangerous and decided not to take action against him any more, while for the Mexican population he served as a way to laugh about the lack of democracy in the country. Zúñiga always dressed as an English gentleman, wearing a cylinder hat, gloves, and a monocle, and smoking a pipe.

Revolutionary period

In 1910, after Francisco I. Madero launched the Mexican Revolution against Díaz, Zúñiga offered to mediate between Díaz and Madero. After the overthrow and murder of Madero by Victoriano Huerta, he complained about the fact that Huerta had annulled the elections for the Congress of Mexico, since he had just planned to be a candidate in that election.

Post-Revolutionary period

After the revolution Zúñiga continued to participate in elections: in 1917 against Venustiano Carranza and in 1920 against Álvaro Obregón. Although he never got more than a few thousand votes he remained popular and reminded Mexicans of the fact that Mexico had not yet become a full democracy after the revolution. In 1920, a small republican party requested to declare the votes for winner Obregón and runner up Alfredo Robles Domínguez void for their participation in the overthrow in president Carranza, which would have led Zúñiga, who came third in the election result, to be declared the winner. This request was however rejected, and Zúñiga tried to become federal deputy in 1922, again without success. Zúñiga last participated in elections in 1924, during which he received death threats from supporters of the 'official' candidate Plutarco Elías Calles. He died a year later.

Legacy

Zúñiga's proclamations as "legitimate president" would later be imitated by José Vasconcelos (1929), Juan Andreu Almazán (1940), Manuel Clouthier (1988), Andrés Manuel López Obrador (2006), and as "legitimate governor" Salvador Nava (1991), all of them being candidated considering themselves to have been victim of election fraud. Zúñiga y Miranda has a prominent spot in Diego Rivera's painting Dream on a Sunday Afternoon in the Alameda and made an appearance in the movie México de mis recuerdos in 1943, in which he was played by Max Langler. Rodrigo Borja Torres wrote a book about Zúñiga's life in 1999.

References
Mellado, Guillermo; Don Nicolás Zúñiga y Miranda. Vida, aventuras y episodos del caballero andante de don Nicolás Zúñiga y Miranda, El Gráfico, Mexico City, 1931.
Torres, Rodrigo Borja; Don Nicolás Zúñiga y Miranda o el candidato perpetuo'', Editorial Miguel Ángel Porrúa, Mexico City, 1999.

See also
 Joshua Norton, self-proclaimed "Emperor of the United States and Protector of Mexico"

1865 births
1925 deaths
People from Zacatecas City
Mexican people of Basque descent
Candidates in the 1892 Mexican presidential election
Candidates in the 1896 Mexican presidential election
Candidates in the 1900 Mexican presidential election
Candidates in the 1904 Mexican presidential election
Candidates in the 1910 Mexican presidential election
Candidates in the 1911 Mexican presidential election
Candidates in the 1913 Mexican presidential election
Candidates in the 1917 Mexican presidential election
Candidates in the 1920 Mexican presidential election
Candidates in the 1924 Mexican presidential election
People of the Mexican Revolution
Seismologists
Mexican democracy activists
Pretenders